Cobalt(II) stearate is a metal-organic compound, a salt of cobalt and stearic acid with the chemical formula . The compound is classified as a metallic soap, i.e. a metal derivative of a fatty acid.

Synthesis
An exchange reaction of sodium stearate and cobalt dichloride:

Physical properties
Cobalt(II) stearate forms a violet substance, occurring in several crystal structures.

Insoluble in water.

Uses
Cobalt(II) stearate is a high-performance bonding agent for rubber. The compound is suitable for applications in natural rubber, cisdene, styrene-butadiene rubber, and their compounds to bond easily with brass- or zinc-plated steel cord or metal plates as well as various bare steel, especially for bonding with brass plating of various thicknesses.

References

Stearates
Cobalt compounds